Route 318 is a state highway in northern Connecticut running entirely in Barkhkamsted.

Description
Route 318 begins at an intersection with US 44 in Barkhamsted and heads east-northeast.  It overlaps Route 181, heading east, to cross the West Branch Farmington River, then continues east over the Saville Dam past Lake McDonough, ending at a "Y" intersection with Route 219.

The section of Route 318 from Route 181 to Route 219 is designated a scenic road.

History
Route 318 was commissioned from SR 860 (Ripley Hill Road) and SR 418 (Saville Dam Road) in 1963 and has had no significant changes since. SR 418 was first designated as a state road in 1937 from Route 181 to the Saville Dam. This was extended across the dam two years later. SR 860 was taken over by the state in 1957.

Junction list

References

External links

318
Transportation in Litchfield County, Connecticut